Para verte mejor is a Venezuelan telenovela written by Mónica Montañes and produced by Sandra Riobóo for Venevisión. The series is starring Michelle de Andrade as Ana, José Ramón Barreto as Guillermo and Luis Gerónimo Abreu as Onofre. It premiered on July 25, 2017 and ended on December 5, 2017.

Plot
Several families move into an apartment building with their illusions, fears and secrets. But no one can imagine the danger they are facing from Onofre Villahermosa, a charming, handsome, friendly neighbour who is actually a criminal, a murderer and psychopath who has installed hidden cameras all over the building to monitor the lives of the occupants and manipulate them like puppets while trying to ensure no one discovers who he really is.

Several years before, Ana de los Ángeles had a  chance encounter with Guillermo who helped to heal her pet dog after it had an accident in the countryside, and it was love at first sight for the two of them. However, they meet years later in the worst of circumstances: she is engaged to his cousin Cristóbal, while he is married and has a young daughter.

All of the characters will fall in love at different ages, falling in love for the first time, after a divorce, after already having grown up children or even grandchildren. But what all these couples have in common is that love will be very difficult, even impossible.

Cast

Starring 
 Michelle de Andrade as Ana de los Ángeles Barranco Mora
 José Ramón Barreto as Guillermo Luis 
 Luis Gerónimo Abreu as Onofre Villahermosa / Pedro Pérez "El Fantasma"
 María Antonieta Duque as Lázara Martínez
 Rafael Romero as Venancio Ruíz
 Sonia Villamizar as Nancy Sosa de Ibáñez
 Simón Pestana as Carlos Enrique Ibáñez
 Patricia Schwarzgruber as Marilda Cienfuegos
 José Manuel Suárez as Luis "Luisito" Martínez
 Adrián Delgado as Cristóbal Andrés Blanco
 Aroldo Betancourt as Pablo Barranco
 Laureano Olivarez as Rafael "Rafucho" Tadeo
 José Luis Zuleta as Beltrán Parra
 Dora Mazzone as María José Mora de Barranco
 Eulalia Siso as Carlota Miguelina Martínez
 Juan Carlos Gardié as Jairo Jesús Bracho
 Félix Loreto as Conrado Sosa Bermúdez
 Liliana Meléndez as Pura de Bracho
 Adriana Romero as Clara Cienfuegos de Parra
 Edmary Fuentes as Micaela Martínez
 Melissa Álvarez as Mireya
 Michael Reyes as Carlos "Carlitos" Ibañez Sosa
 Karlis Romero as Purita Bracho
 Mandi Meza as Yenny Coromoto
 Ángel Casallas as Pedro "Pedrote" Martínez
 Alejandra Machado as Patricia Patricia Ibáñez Sosa
 Libby Brien as Cristina 
 Alessandro Bastidas as Mario
 Jonathan Manrique as Jonathan

Guest Appearance 
 Javier Vidal as Onofre Villahermosa
 Daniela Alvarado as Danielita
Carmen Julia Álvarez as Alicia Leal de Blanco
Alejandro Mata as Fernando Blanco
Josué Villae as Claudio Gallardo Núñez
Jordán Mendoza as Suárez
Yugui López as Perro de agua
Marycarmen Sobrino as Olga Villahermosa

Production

Casting 
On May 13, 2016 Sheryl Rubio and José Ramón Barreto were confirmed as the protagonists of the series, In July 2016, Rubio confirmed her departure from production due to the current problems and insecurity that occur in Venezuela and explained: 

After the incident Monica Montañés had to rewrite the character that would play Rubio, because she had been working with the character based on the actress for months. On August 12, 2016, Venevisión reported that Michelle de Andrade would be Sheryl Rubio's replacement in the telenovela and would be the main protagonist of the series. Andrade was in Brazil, when he was called by his manager to assist in the casting of production.

References 

Spanish-language telenovelas
Venevisión telenovelas
Venezuelan telenovelas
2017 Venezuelan television series debuts
2017 Venezuelan television series endings
2017 telenovelas
Television shows set in Caracas